Renette Pauline Soutendijk (born 21 May 1957), known professionally as Renée Soutendijk, is a Dutch actress. A gymnast in her youth, Soutendijk began her acting career in the late 1970s. She was a favorite star of director Paul Verhoeven's films, and is perhaps best known for her work in his 1980 release Spetters and 1983's The Fourth Man. Her good looks and striking blond hair secured her status as a Dutch sex symbol in the 1980s.

Soutendijk attempted to establish herself in the United States in the late 1980s, and appeared in the science fiction film Eve of Destruction (1991). Since the 2000s she has played a number of television and stage roles, and appeared as one of the leads in the 2012 RTL 4 television series Moordvrouw. She has also had supporting roles in the American drama A Perfect Man (2013) and in Luca Guadagnino's Suspiria (2018).

Life and career

Early life
Soutendijk was born in Amsterdam, North Holland, Netherlands, on 21 May 1957. In her youth, Soutendijk was a qualifying Olympic gymnast. She studied acting at the Academy for Podium Formation in The Hague.

Television and film beginnings
Soutendijk made her television debut in the Dutch television series Dagboek van een herdershond (English: Dutch the Shepherd Dog (1979–1980). She began her film career playing the heroines in the Paul Verhoeven-directed cult films Spetters (1980) and The Fourth Man (1983). Spetters established her as a sex symbol; the movie and its star attracted attention in the United States as well, and The New York Times saw her "stylish performance" of a "compelling character" as a focal point of the movie. In the early 1980s, Soutendijk, Monique van de Ven, and Willeke van Ammelrooy were the three best-known actresses in Dutch cinema, and most Dutch movies featured one of the three. The movie that marked her breakthrough as an actress in a major role, though, is considered to be The Girl with the Red Hair (1981), in which she played Dutch resistance fighter Hannie Schaft. From 1981 to 1989 she played in Zeg 'ns Aaa, one of the longest-running and most popular Dutch sitcoms. In 1983, Soutendijk gave birth to her first child, a daughter named Caro.

 
Soutendijk's first English-language role was as Eva Braun in the made-for-TV movie Inside the Third Reich. Her subsequent TV movie roles included Anna Mons in Peter the Great (1986) and Mrs. Simon Wiesenthal in Murderers Among Us (1989). She sought a career in Hollywood and lived in the United States for a year and a half. She played opposite Academy-award nominee Chris Sarandon in the Holocaust-themed movie Forced March (1989), and the title character in Eve of Destruction (1991), in which she portrayed an android opposite Gregory Hines.

In the late 1990s she played in another Dutch film (De Flat). She also acted in German television movies (and series, including Tatort) in which, she said, she was rarely typecast and played more interesting characters. In 1996, she gave birth to her son, Jaïr. The films Dial 9 and Met grote blijdschap (With Great Joy), which were both released in 2001, marked her return to the Dutch movie-screen after a four-year absence.

2000s and later career
Soutendijk subsequently played roles in television shows and as a stage actress, playing for instance Queen Juliana (2006) and a woman dying of cancer in Margaret Edson's Wit (2010). In 2011, Soutendijk was given the Rembrandt Award for her body of work. That same year, news came that Soutendijk was to star in a television series for RTL 4, Moordvrouw, a police drama. In 2018, Soutendijk had a supporting role in Luca Guadagnino's Suspiria, a reimagining of the Dario Argento film of the same name.

, she is scheduled to appear in the photography game show Het perfecte plaatje.

Filmography

Film

Television

References

Sources

External links

1957 births
Actresses from Amsterdam
Living people
Dutch film actresses
Golden Calf winners
Dutch television actresses
Dutch stage actresses
20th-century Dutch actresses
21st-century Dutch actresses